Jinhu Township is an urban township of Kinmen (Quemoy), Fujian Province, Republic of China (Taiwan). It is in the Taiwan Strait, on the coast of mainland China. Jinhu Township is the largest township in Kinmen County.

History
On July 1, 1953, Canghu Township was renamed Jinhu Township, a rural township. In December 1957, Jinhu was changed back into an urban township.

In 1959, Jinqiong Township was created from the two villages Zhengyi and Qionglin. On September 16, 1965, Jinqiong Township was disbanded and the major part of the two villages returned to Jinhu Township.

Geography

The township includes Dongding Island, Beiding Island, and other small islets.

Politics and government

Administrative divisions
Jinhu Township is made up of eight urban villages:
 Lianan / Lienan Village
 Liaoluo Village
 Qionglin / Cyonglin Village (Ch'iung-lin)
 Shanwai Village (Shan-wai)
 Xihu / Sihu Village
 Xinhu / Sinhu Village
 Xinshi / Sinshi Village
 Zhengyi / Jhengyi Village

Mayors
Mayor of Shawei
 Chang Jung-Chiang 1947-1951
Appointed Mayors
 Chen Te-hui
 Yang Cheng-Fu
 Wu Ti-Yuan
 Tsai In-Tang from 1954
 Teng Chen-Kang, also mayor of Jinsha, Kinmen
 Li Tsai-Chien
 Yang Yao-Ming
 Kai Chia-Ting
 Chen I-Huang 1971-1975
Elected Mayors
 Chen I-Huang 1971-1975
 Chen Yung-Tsai 1975-1986
 Chen Yun-Hsuan 1986-1990
 Chen Yung-Tsai 1990-1993
 Tsai Fu-Lu 1993-1997
 Chen Fu-hai 1997-2003
 Li Cheng-I 2003-2008
 Tsai Hsien-Ching 2008-2010
 Tsai Hsi-Hu 2010-2018
 Chen Wen-Ku 2018–present

Infrastructures
 Hsiahsing Power Plant
 Taihu Reservoir

Tourist attractions

 August 23 Artillery Battle Museum
 Chenggong Coastal Defense Tunnel
 Chen Jing-lan Western House
 Kinmen Cultural Village
 Kinmen Ceramics Museum
 Kinmen National Park
 Qingtian Hall
 Qionglin Tunnel
 Yu Da Wei Xian Sheng Memorial Museum
 Wind Lion Plaza
 Wu-Wang-Zai-Ju Inscribed Rock
 Zhongzheng Park

Transportation
 Kinmen Airport

Notable natives
Chern Jenn-chuan, Minister of Public Construction Commission (2012-2013)

See also
List of islands of Taiwan

References

External links

 Jinhu Provincial Government website